Evidence Based Birth is an online pregnancy and childbirth resource. It was founded in 2012 by nurse Rebecca Dekker.

History 
According to The Cut, the organization also "trains thousands of pregnancy and childbirth professionals."

The website was used as a resource in Microbia: A Journey into the Unseen World Around You.

Reception 
In 2020, Brides magazine ranked Evidence Based Birth one of the "6 websites every pregnant women should know about."

References 

American women's websites
Internet properties established in 2012